Seshemnefer (also labelled Seshemnefer III) was an ancient Egyptian official of the Fifth Dynasty, most likely under king Djedkare Isesi. At the end of his career he became vizier, the highest office in Ancient Egypt, second only to the king.

Seshemnefer was born into an influential family. His father was also called Seshemnefer, his mother Henutsen. The father was overseer of the scribes of the king's document and overseer of all royal works. Seshemnefer III is mainly known from his mastaba (tomb) at Giza (G5170), which was excavated under the direction of Wilhelm Sieglin. The chapel of the mastaba is now in the museum of the University of Tübingen. 

Seshemnefer's wife, Hetepheres, was priestess of Neith, but also king's daughter of his body. He had four sons, three of whom were also called Seshemnefer; the fourth was called Neferseshemptah. One of these sons, Seshemnefer (IV), was buried at Dahshur and had mastaba there. 

In the chapel of his mastaba, Seshemnefer appears most often as overseer of the scribes of the king's document. At the end of his career he became vizier and overseer of all royal works. He also received the title king's son of his body, albeit evidently not being the son of a king. 

The precise dating of Seshemnefer can be concluded only by architectural observations, as no king's name is preserved in his tomb. The mastaba of Seshemnefer uses the rear wall of the mastaba of an official named Rawer, which, in turn, uses the rear wall of the mastaba of official named Djaty who is securely datable under king Neferirkare. Rawer and Seshemnefer must therefore date later.

References

Bibliography 

Viziers of the Fifth Dynasty of Egypt
Ancient Egyptian overseers of royal works